Maeridae is a family of marine amphipods, which was first described by Taudl Krapp-Schickel in 2008.

Genera 
Accepted genera:
 Anamaera Thomas & Barnard, 1985
 Anelasmopus Oliveira, 1953
 Animoceradocus G. Karaman, 1984
 Austromaera Lowry & Springthorpe, 2005
 Bathyceradocus Pirlot, 1934
 Beaudettia J.L. Barnard, 1965
 Ceradocoides Nicholls, 1938
 Ceradocopsis Schellenberg, 1926
 Ceradocus Costa, 1853
 Ceradomaera Ledoyer, 1973
 Clessidra Krapp-Schickel & Vader, 2009
 Coxomaerella G. Karaman, 1981
 Dumosus Thomas & Barnard, 1985
 Elasmopoides Stebbing, 1908
 Elasmopus Costa, 1853
 Glossomaera Krapp-Schickel, 2009
 Hamimaera Krapp-Schickel, 2008
 Hoho Lowry & Fenwick, 1983
 Ifalukia J.L. Barnard, 1972
 Jerbarnia Croker, 1971
 Linguimaera Pirlot, 1936
 Lupimaera Barnard & Karaman, 1982
 Maera Leach, 1814
 Maeracoota Myers, 1997
 Maerella Chevreux, 1911
 Maeropsis Chevreux, 1919
 Mallacoota Barnard, 1972
 Megaceradocus Mukai, 1979
 Metaceradocoides Birstein & M. Vinogradov, 1960
 Meximaera Ledoyer, 1983
 Miramaera Lowry & Springthorpe, 2005
 Othomaera Krapp-Schickel, 2000
 Paraceradocus Stebbing, 1899
 Parelasmopus Stebbing, 1888
 Pseudelasmopus Ledoyer, 1978
 Quadrimaera Krapp-Schickel & Ruffo, 2000
 Quadrivisio Stebbing, 1907
 Ruffomaera Krapp-Schickel, 2008
 Saurodocus Yerman & Krapp-Schickel, 2008
 Spathiopus Thomas & Barnard, 1985
 Thalassostygius Vonk, 1990
 Wimvadocus Krapp-Schickel & Jarrett, 2000
 Zygomaera Krapp-Schickel, 20

References

Further reading
 Lowry, J.K.; Hughes, L.E. 2009: Maeridae, the Elasmopus group. Pp. 643-702 en Lowry, J.K.; Myers, A.A. (eds.) Benthic Amphipoda (Crustacea: Peracarida) of the Great Barrier Reef. Zootaxa, 2260: 1-930.
 Lowry, J.K. & Myers, A.A. (2013) A Phylogeny and Classification of the Senticaudata subord. nov. (Crustacea: Amphipoda). Zootaxa 3610 (1): 1-80.

External links 

Maeridae
Taxa described in 2008